The Dancing Crazy Tour was the debut solo tour by American entertainer Miranda Cosgrove. Visiting North America, it supported her debut studio album, Sparks Fly. The tour began in Missouri and traveled throughout the United States and ended in Ohio. Cosgrove continued the tour into the summer to promote her second EP, High Maintenance. Dubbed the Dancing Crazy Summer Tour, the singer traveled the United States and Canada and performed at music festivals and state fairs.

Background
Originally conceived as the "Sparks Fly Tour", Cosgrove provided a few tour dates on her official website in October 2010. In December, Cosgrove announced the tour on her official website before the news hit various media outlets the next day. Now known as the Dancing Crazy Tour, Cosgrove toured the United States in theaters and music halls. Later, Cosgrove released the single "Dancing Crazy", which was co-written by Avril Lavigne with Max Martin and Shellback, who produced it. Joining Cosgrove on tour was American singer-songwriter Greyson Chance, who gained notoriety in 2010 with his cover of Lady Gaga's "Paparazzi". To introduce the tour, Cosgrove stated, "I used to always think I was just going to be an actress, but now I'm leaning towards music and singing too. In the beginning, I didn't really think about my sound too much. I was just trying to figure out the kind of music that was really me and my thing. But my songs are about the experiences I've been through, and when I'm singing them, I try to put myself into it, so hopefully my music just reflects me."

Cancellation
On August 11, 2011, the tour was interrupted when Cosgrove's tour bus was involved in a traffic collision on Interstate 70 in Vandalia, Illinois. Cosgrove and four other passengers were injured, with her sustaining a broken ankle. Initial reports confirmed that the tour would be postponed while Cosgrove recovered. A week later, Cosgrove released a statement stating that the tour was canceled by the doctor's orders.

Set list

Shows

Cancelled

Notes

References

External links
 Miranda Cosgrove's Official Website

2011 concert tours
Miranda Cosgrove concert tours